Conservative Catholics may refer to:

 Conservative Christianity
 Traditionalist Catholicism
 Conservative Catholics (Italy)
 Christian Democratic People's Party of Switzerland, originally called Catholic Conservative Party

See also 

 Christian democracy
 Social conservatism